Tetracha inca is a species of tiger beetle that was described by Naviaux and Ugarte-Pena in 2006, and is endemic to Peru.

References

Cicindelidae
Endemic fauna of Peru
Beetles of South America
Beetles described in 2006